Justin Burrell (born April 18, 1988) is an American professional basketball player for Sendai 89ers of the B.League. He played college basketball for the St. John's Red Storm from 2007 to 2011.

Overseas Elite
In 2017, Justin Burrell joined Overseas Elite for The Basketball Tournament (TBT), a $2 million winner-take-all competition aired annually on ESPN. During TBT 2017, Burrell averaged 9.2 points per game (PPG) and 4.8 rebounds per game (RPG) to help Overseas Elite claim their third consecutive title. In TBT 2018, Burrell played six games. He averaged 12.0 PPG and 7.0 RPG on 69 percent shooting. Overseas Elite reached the championship game and played Eberlein Drive, winning 70–58 for their fourth consecutive TBT title. In TBT 2019, Burrell and Overseas Elite advanced to the semifinals where they suffered their first-ever defeat, losing to Carmen's Crew, 71–66.

Career statistics 

|-
| align="left" |  2011–12
| align="left" | Yokohama
| 52 ||52  || 31.8 || .517 || .333 || .675 || 9.9 || 1.9 || 0.9 || 0.5 || 18.7
|-
| align="left" |  2014–15
| align="left" | Chiba
| 54 ||38  || 26.8 || .539 || .250 || .650 || 8.1 || 1.4 || 0.3 || 0.5 || 15.5
|-
| align="left" |  2015–16
| align="left" | Mitsubishi
| 53 ||48  || 31.9 || .528 || .267 || .642 || 9.3 || 2.1 || 0.6 || 0.8 || 17.0
|-
| align="left" |  2016–17
| align="left" | Nagoya D
|45  ||45  || 27.6 || .540 || .333 ||.731  ||8.4  ||1.9  ||0.4  ||1.0  ||16.8 
|-
| align="left" |  2017–18
| align="left" | Nagoya D
|56  ||50  || 22.9 || .608 || .222 ||.771  ||7.5  ||2.4  ||0.5  ||0.5  ||14.8 
|-

References

1988 births
Living people
American expatriate basketball people in France
American expatriate basketball people in Japan
American men's basketball players
Basketball players from New York City
Chiba Jets Funabashi players
Cholet Basket players
Nagoya Diamond Dolphins players
Power forwards (basketball)
Reims Champagne Basket players
Sportspeople from the Bronx
St. John's Red Storm men's basketball players
Yokohama B-Corsairs players